
Year 432 BC was a year of the pre-Julian Roman calendar. At the time, it was known as the Year of the Tribunate of Mamercus, Albinus and Medullinus (or, less frequently, year 322 Ab urbe condita). The denomination 432 BC for this year has been used since the early medieval period, when the Anno Domini calendar era became the prevalent method in Europe for naming years.

Events 
 By place 

 Greece 
 Sparta calls and hosts a conference of the Peloponnesian League. The conference is attended by Athenian representatives as well as members of the League. Following arguments by Corinth against Athens, a majority of the League members vote to declare that the Athenians had broken the peace.
 The Athenian admiral, Phormio, continues the siege of Potidaea by blocking the entrance to the Gulf of Corinth. Meanwhile an Athenian fleet, led by Archestratus, sails for Potidaea. However, instead of attacking Potidaea, they attack the Macedonians under Perdiccas II, who have allied with the Potidaeans. The Athenians capture Therma (modern Thessalonica) and then go on to besiege Pydna. However, as the Athenians are besieging Pydna, they receive news that Corinth has sent a force under the command of Aristeus to support Potidaea. In response, Athens sends more troops and ships under the command of Hipponicus. The combined Athenian force sails to Potidaea and lands there. In the ensuing Battle of Potidaea, the Athenians are victorious against Corinth and its allies.

 Italy 
 The Greek colony of Heraclea in Southern Italy is founded by colonists from Tarentum and Thurii.

 China 
 The Chinese Marquis Yi of Zeng is buried (approximate date) with lavish tomb items including a 65 set of bronze bells (bianzhong) with five octave musical scale and two musical tones that can be produced by each bell. Marquis Yi was from the State of Chu during the Warring States phase of the Zhou Dynasty.

 By topic 

 Astronomy 
 Meton of Athens, a Greek mathematician and astronomer, calculates accurately the comparative chronology of the solar and lunar cycles. As a result, he introduces the 19-year Metonic cycle into the Athenian calendar as a method of calculating dates. Working with Euctemon, he observes the summer solstice on 27 June.

 Architecture 
 Pheidias completes the sculptures that form the decoration of the Parthenon in Athens.

Births 
 Dionysius, tyrant of Syracuse (d. 367 BC) (approximate birth date)

Deaths

References